Hotel Kämp is an historic hotel in Kluuvi, Helsinki, Finland. It is a member of Leading Hotels of the World.

The hotel, originally built in 1887 by Carl Kämp, was designed by Theodor Höijer. The building was demolished and the facade was rebuilt in 1965. The headquarters of the bank Kansallis-Osake-Pankki (now part of Nordea) were situated in the building for almost three decades, until 1995.

A major restoration project, started in 1996, culminated in the reopening of Hotel Kämp in 1999 as part of The Luxury Collection. A shopping centre, was also opened within the same city block.

Celebrities who have stayed at the hotel include Madonna, Shakira, Whitney Houston, Elton John, The Rolling Stones, Backstreet Boys and Bruce Springsteen. Royal guests have included Queen Noor of Jordan and Emperor Hirohito of Japan.

See also 
 Palace Hotel, Helsinki
 Hotel Marski
 Hotel Torni

References

External links

Hotel Kämp – Official website 
History and photographs of Hotel Kämp by cosmopolis.ch
 Hotel Kämp: a History of one of Helsinki’s most famous Hotels

Hotels established in 1887
Hotel buildings completed in 1965
Hotels in Helsinki
Hotel Kamp